Yury Viktorovich Zaitsev (born 16 December 1970) is a Russian politician and statesman, who is currently the acting Head of Mari El since 10 May 2022.

Biography

Yury Zaitsev was born on 16 December 1970 in the city of Monino, in Moscow Oblast.

He graduated from the Military Institute of the Ministry of Defense of the USSR with a degree in Foreign Language with the qualification of Interpreter-Referent, Specialist in the Information and Analytical Field.

He has a PhD in economics.

From February to August 2014, Zaitsev was an adviser, and then the first deputy general director of IDGC JSC of the North Caucasus. Later, he served as CEO of the company for five years.

In 2019, he was appointed Chairman of the Government of the Republic of Kalmykia.

On 10 May 2022, Russian President Vladimir Putin appointed Zaitsev as the acting head of Mari El in connection with the resignation of the previous head of the region Alexander Yevstifeyev.

Personal life

Zaitsev is married and has a son.

References

1970 births
Living people
United Russia politicians
People from Shchyolkovsky District
Heads of Mari El